John Daggett (May 9, 1833 – August 30, 1919) was a mine owner and politician who served as the 16th Lieutenant Governor of California from 1883 to 1887.

Biography
Daggett was born in Newark, New York on May 9, 1833.  At age 19 he moved to Nevada with his brother David, after mining for gold there, in 1853 they moved to California, where they became involved in several gold mining ventures.  He bought into the Black Bear Mine in 1862, sold out in 1863, re-opened it in 1866, and sold out again in 1872. He bought it again in 1884.  Daggett also held an interest in the Calico Silver Mine in San Bernardino County.  The area around this site was later renamed Daggett in his honor.

A Democrat, Daggett was elected to the California State Assembly in 1858, and re-elected in 1859 and 1880.  Daggett was elected lieutenant governor in 1882, and served from 1883 to 1887.

As lieutenant governor, Daggett drew the ire of Democratic legislators seeking to pass legislation restricting the state's powerful railroad interests in an 1884 special session of the Legislature. After votes on a bill regulating the railroads tied in the State Senate, Daggett sided with a bloc of conservative Democratic senators and cast tie-breaking votes to block the legislation. Daggett's decision to side with conservative Democrats and the railroads led to his formal expulsion from the Democratic Party at a June 1884 state convention in Stockton dominated by anti-railroad Democrats. Daggett would later be restored to a formal role with the party at a subsequent convention in 1886, where he was elected first vice president of the state central committee.

Superintendent of the San Francisco Mint
On May 18, 1893, he was nominated by President Grover Cleveland to serve as Superintendent of the United States Mint at San Francisco, a position he held until 1897.

Daggett is associated with the rare 1894-S Barber dime. One version of the story indicates that the 24 coins were struck June 9, 1894 to provide a balance of two dollars and forty cents needed to close a bullion account at the Mint June 30, 1894. It was anticipated that more dimes would be struck that year, albeit two or three pieces were obtained by Mint employees eager to have a new dime (with two or three going to Chief Coiner Charles Gorham). The balance were placed in coin bags, destined for circulation.

Another story goes that Daggett had 24 dimes struck as a special request for some visiting bankers. According to daughter Hallie as recounted much later, her father presented three coins each to seven people, with the remaining three given to her with instructions to save them until she was as old as he was, at which time she would be able to sell them for a good price. Apparently she spent one coin on ice cream on the way home; this now well-worn coin is said to have sold for $2.40 in Gimbel's department store in New York City in 1957 and it sold for $34,100 at auction in 1981. Much later Hallie sold the remaining two dimes to California dealer Earl Parker, with one selling in 2007 for $1.9M.

He died in Siskiyou County, California in 1919.

References

1894-S BARBER DIME

Lieutenant Governors of California
1833 births
1919 deaths
People from Newark, New York
19th-century American politicians